Indian Summer is a 1993 American comedy drama film written and directed by Mike Binder. The movie was filmed at Camp Tamakwa (a summer camp in Algonquin Provincial Park in Ontario, Canada), which Binder had attended for ten summers as a child camper. Indian Summer features an ensemble cast, including Binder's childhood friend, film director Sam Raimi, who has a supporting role in it.

Plot
"Unca" Lou Handler (Alan Arkin), the beloved owner and director of Camp Tamakwa, invites thirty former campers - from the camp's "golden years" two decades ago - back to the camp to announce his retirement.  Seven friends who attended during the summer of 1972, all now adults, respond to the invitation and return for a one-week reunion. Once there, the group comes to feel nostalgic memories of their youth, and unresolved feelings for each other begin to surface.

The invitees include clothing designer Matt Berman (Vincent Spano), his cousin and business partner Brad Berman (Kevin Pollak), Matt's wife Kelly (Julie Warner), Kelly's friend and Matt's ex-girlfriend Jennifer Martin (Elizabeth Perkins), art gallery employee Jack Belston (Bill Paxton), recently widowed Beth Warden (Diane Lane), and carefree bachelor Jamie Ross (Matt Craven), who brings his much younger girlfriend, 21-year-old Gwen Daugherty (Kimberly Williams).

While willing to participate in the camp reunion, Brad finds the place smaller and dingier than he remembers, and he can't wait to get back to managing his business. Matt feels trapped being in business with Brad, despite their success, because he wants to do other things with his life.

Uncertain about his relationship with Kelly, Matt expresses renewed romantic feelings for Jennifer. Worldly but still single and occasionally lonely as she approaches middle age, Jennifer is tempted to reciprocate.  Lou has other ideas, though, and he nips their tryst in the bud.  Kelly confronts Matt about her concern that he is becoming distant, after which they work to repair their relationship.

Beth is working through the trauma of losing her husband Rick to a tragic accident one year ago. Jack was Rick's best friend, and regrets not being able to attend his funeral. Although initially tentative in their interactions, Beth and Jack eventually begin a relationship with each other during the reunion.

Jamie is happy being single, with no intentions of starting a family anytime soon. Gwen wants to start a family, and increasingly resents and eventually stands up to Jamie's dismissal and objectification of her.

Having been kicked out of camp as a child and sent home by Unca Lou, Jack nevertheless returns to make amends for what he did - burying Lou's 1946 Michigan State boxing trophy in retaliation for an act of racial prejudice committed by Lou, very much inconsistent with the values taught at camp. Lou eventually acknowledges this and expresses regret over his actions.

Camp traditions include moose watching, shreks (pranks), Lou doing a "dirty dog" (catching campers sneaking out of their cabins at night), the morning wakeup bell, taking what recreational opportunities Wakonda (the Indian god of weather) provides, boxing as both athletic discipline and means of settling arguments, and Lou bestowing the same "super-secret Indian name" (Thundering Cloud) on young campers having trouble socially adjusting to the camp environment.

Lou's primary reason for retiring is his inability to connect with a new generation of kids more interested in boomboxes and headphones than in the great outdoors. Beth and Jack decide they are up to the task, and they want to continue running the camp. Lou gives them his blessing, and they go on to welcome the next class of Tamakwa campers.

Cast
 Alan Arkin as Lou "Unca" Handler
 Matt Craven as Jamie Ross
 Diane Lane as Beth Warden / Claire Everett In A Flashback
 Bill Paxton as Jack Belston
 Elizabeth Perkins as Jennifer Morton
 Kevin Pollak as Brad Berman
 Sam Raimi as "Stick" Coder
 Vincent Spano as Matthew Berman
 Julie Warner as Kelly Berman
 Kimberly Williams as Gwen Daugherty

Reception
The film's reviews were mixed. It holds a 58% "rotten" rating on Rotten Tomatoes based on 19 reviews.

References

External links

 
 
 
 Camp Tamakwa

1993 films
American comedy-drama films
1993 comedy-drama films
Touchstone Pictures films
Films about summer camps
Films directed by Mike Binder
Films scored by Miles Goodman
1990s English-language films
1990s American films